Kazimierz Cwojdziński (born January 8, 1878 in Plewiska near Poznań, died August 12, 1948 in Poznań) was a Polish mathematician and professor of the School of Engineering in Poznań. Cwojdziński published his works regarding secondary school curriculum and school mathematics in the journals Wiadomości Matematyczne, Muzeum, Parametr, and Matematyka as well as the German journal Archiv der Mathematik und Physik. He was among the first year-group to obtain a doctorate in mathematics from the Adam Mickiewicz University.

During the Nazi occupation of Poland in World War II Cwojdziński was one of the most active teachers in clandestine schools in Greater Poland.

References

Further reading
 Władysława Dembecka, Kazimierz Cwojdziński, in: Wielkopolski słownik biograficzny, Państwowe Wydawnictwo Naukowe, Warszawa 1981
 Adam Wachułka, Kazimierz Cwojdziński, in: Słownik biograficzny matematyków polskich (ed. Stanisław Domoradzki, Zofia Pawlikowska-Brożek, Danuta Węglowska), Państwowa Wyższa Szkoła Zawodowa im. Prof. Stanisława Tarnowskiego w Tarnobrzegu, Tarnobrzeg 2003, p. 40

1878 births
1948 deaths
20th-century Polish mathematicians
People from Poznań County